Pachydesmus crassicutis is a species of flat-backed millipede in the family Xystodesmidae. It is found in North America.

Subspecies
These eight subspecies belong to the species Pachydesmus crassicutis:
 Pachydesmus crassicutis adsinicolus Hoffman, 1958
 Pachydesmus crassicutis crassicutis (Wood, 1864)
 Pachydesmus crassicutis denticulatus Chamberlin, 1946
 Pachydesmus crassicutis duplex Chamberlin, 1939
 Pachydesmus crassicutis hubrichti Hoffman, 1958
 Pachydesmus crassicutis incursus Chamberlin, 1939
 Pachydesmus crassicutis laticollis (Attems, 1899)
 Pachydesmus crassicutis retrorsus Chamberlin, 1921

References

Further reading

 

Polydesmida
Articles created by Qbugbot
Animals described in 1864